The Purduettes are the primary treble choral ensemble of Purdue University. Formed in 1942, the group typically consists of 50-60 undergraduate collegiate women, and performs a variety of jazz, gospel, and swing songs. Similar to the all-male Purdue Varsity Glee Club, the Purduettes are housed within Purdue Musical Organizations, wear matching attire, employ student leadership, and feature smaller groups of members known as Specialites that perform during shows. The group is a featured ensemble annually in the Purdue Christmas Show, and in 2022 the Purduettes celebrated their 80th anniversary. Roughly every 4–5 years the Purduettes tour internationally, most recently to Costa Rica in 2015, and were planned to travel to Italy in spring 2020.

Current Roster (2022-2023) 

First Sopranos
 Hannah Idrissi Alami
 Caitlin Ashby
 Marielle Berin
 Abigail Brouwer*
 Kendra Burgei*
 Baylee Clore*
 Brittany Gonzalez-Pelayo
 Grace Kindig
 Ali Lucas
 Katelyn Martini
 Rebecca May
 Kailey Oakes
 Andrea Romero
 Riley Savage
 Elizabeth Waterman*
 Rebecca Winer

Second Sopranos
 Kriti Bagchi
 Savannah Bretsch
 Abigael Click
 Samantha Corey
 Madison Deese
 Lydia Denniston
 Paige Distler
 Abigail Fouts
 Britney Ho
 Shae Humphrey
 Cara Janis
 Kassandra Orander
 Hadleigh Pierce
 Caroline Svendsen*
 Sydney Thoma
 Molly Walker*
 Adeline Waltz*
 Taylor Webber

First Altos
 Paige Beattie
 Lauren Bosteder
 Caitlyn Cass
 Abigail Corcoran
 Allison Deckard*
 Mihika Desai
 Maggie Fincher
 Sara Hobart
 Jenna Holdman
 Emelia Lopez
 Jessica Miller*
 Caroline Pfunder
 Colleen Place
 Olivia Robinson
 Hope Schimmelpfennig*
 Hridya Shah
 Victoria Vitatoe
 Morgan Yount

Second Altos
 Kiera Brummet
 Rachel Cooper
 Cecilia Daily
 Suzanne Elia
 Amanda Kirchner
 Ana Negron-Carrero
 Lynlee Rice
 Addison Schreiber
 Perion Sharp
 Keagan Slocum
 Neha Sunil
 Sonia Aleman Villegas
 Erin Wilson

*Indicates student leadership

Current Specialty Groups (2022-2023) 
Purduette Trio
Relive the nostalgic song stylings of the Andrews and McGuire sisters, and the big band and swing sounds of the ’40s and ’50s with this trio of talented vocalists that are sure to keep memories alive and toes tapping. 
 Cecilia Daily
 Jessica Miller
 Kailey Oakes

The Remedy
With their angelic voices and folksy charm, The Remedy sings an appealing variety of sacred and secular Americana music to heal souls in a wounded world. 
 Baylee Clore
 Sara Hobart
 Colleen Place
 Lynlee Rice

Lonely Hearts
This dynamic, energetic group sings a wide variety of music, from girl groups of the 1960s to movie tunes to contemporary pop, jazz and Latin hits. While performing the songs of Etta James to Sara Bareilles to Imelda May, the Lonely Hearts maintain a style, groove and sense of moxie that audiences love.
 Caitlin Ashby
 Caitlyn Cass
 Britney Ho
 Amanda Kirchner
 Addison Schreiber
 Sydney Thoma

References 

American choirs
Purdue University